Markus Eisenschmid (born 22 January 1995) is a German ice hockey player who is under contract to the Adler Mannheim of the Deutsche Eishockey Liga. He has previously played for the St. John's IceCaps and the Laval Rocket of the American Hockey League.

Playing career
During his youth, Eisenschmid played for the youth team of the ESV Kaufbeuren. From the 2011–12 and 2012–13 season, he ran in the Deutsche Nachwuchsliga (DNL). At the same time, he was first appointed to the junior team of the national team. In the 2012–13 season, Eisenschmid completed his first game for the first team in the former 2nd Bundesliga. In April 2013, Eisenschmid was committed by the Hamburg Freezers, for which he never ran aground.

Before the 2013–14 season, North America scouts became aware of Eisenschmid. He was selected by the Medicine Hat Tigers of the Western Hockey League (WHL) in the CHL Import Draft in the first round in 28th overall. Due to a clause in his contract, he was able to switch to the Medicine Hat Tigers in the WHL whom he played with for two seasons. After two successful seasons in the Canadian Hockey League (CHL), he was invited by the Montreal Canadiens summer training camp due to good performance. He was then offered an AHL contract with the St. John's IceCaps, for which he was active from October 2015. In January 2017, the Canadiens equipped him with a two-year contract, after which he ran aground at the beginning of the 2017–18 season for their new farm team, the Laval Rocket.

In June 2018, he signed a contract with the Adler Mannheim of the Deutsche Eishockey Liga (DEL) and thus returned to his homeland.

International play
Eisenschmid has represented Germany since his first nomination to the U16 national team of the DEB-Pokal. He also took part in the World Junior Championships for Germany. Eisenschmid debuted for the German senior national team at the end of April 2018 for the 2018 Euro Hockey Challenge and then took part in the 2018 World Championship in Denmark.

Personal life
Eisenschmid has two sisters who also play hockey. His older sister, Tanja, and his younger sister, Nicola played for the German women's national team. His older brother Michael plays ball hockey.

Career statistics

Regular season and playoffs

International

Awards and honours

References

External links

1995 births
Adler Mannheim players
ESV Kaufbeuren players
German expatriates in Canada
German ice hockey centres
Laval Rocket players
Living people
Medicine Hat Tigers players
People from Marktoberdorf
Sportspeople from Swabia (Bavaria)
St. John's IceCaps players